The Agglomeration community of Le Havre (French: Communauté de l'agglomération havraise) is a former communauté d'agglomération, an intercommunal structure, centred on the city of Le Havre. It is located in the Seine-Maritime department, in the Normandy region, northern France. It was created in January 2001. It was merged into the new communauté urbaine Le Havre Seine Métropole on 1 January 2019. Its population was 239,806 in 2015, of which 174,911 in Le Havre proper.

Composition
The communauté d'agglomération consisted of the following 17 communes:

References

Former agglomeration communities in France
Le Havre
Geography of Seine-Maritime